Mary Kiffmeyer (born December 29, 1946) is an American politician. She served as Minnesota Secretary of State from 1999 to 2007 and went on to serves in the Minnesota legislature. A member of the Republican Party of Minnesota, she previously represented District 30, which included parts of Hennepin, Sherburne, and Wright counties.

Early life
The oldest of 14 children, Kiffmeyer was raised in Pierz, Minnesota.

Minnesota Secretary of State
Kiffmeyer was elected secretary of state in November 1998, and was sworn into office on January 4, 1999. She was re-elected in November 2002. She was defeated for re-election in November 2006 by Mark Ritchie.

During Kiffmeyer's tenure, Minnesota was the highest voter turnout state for all 8 years as determined by Curtis Ganz of the Center for Democracy.  In 2004, Minnesota had 77.7% voter turnout, the highest in the state since 1960. She transformed the Secretary of State website allowing users to find and get directions to their local precincts, and see who their local candidates are in the upcoming election through the "My Ballot" feature..

During Kiffmeyer's tenure, she convinced the legislature to establish the Safe At Home Program for battered women or other battered victims which was unfunded by the Legislature until the following year.

Minnesota Legislature
Kiffmeyer was elected to the Minnesota House of Representatives in 2008 and re-elected in 2010, representing District 16B. In 2012, she was elected to the Minnesota Senate, representing District 30. Kiffmeyer currently serves as the President Pro Tem of the Minnesota Senate.

Electoral history
 Minnesota Senate 30th district election, 2020
 Mary Kiffmeyer (Republican), 34714	 (67.3%)
 Diane Nguyen (DFL), 16861 (32.7%)
 Write-in, 45 (0.1%)
 Minnesota Senate 30th district election, 2016
 Mary Kiffmeyer (Republican), 30484	 (71.7%)
 P.J. LaCroix (DFL), 11979 (28.2%)
 Write-in, 49 (0.1%)
 Minnesota Senate 30th district election, 2012
 Mary Kiffmeyer (Republican), 25205 (62.4%)
 Paul Perovich (DFL), 15125 (37.5%)
 Write-in, 58 (0.1%)
 Minnesota House of Representatives 16B district election, 2010
 Mary Kiffmeyer (Republican), 13,254 (70.4%)
 Tom Heyd (DFL), 5,563 (29.5%)
 Write-in, 18 (0.1%)
 Minnesota House of Representatives 16B district election, 2008
 Mary Kiffmeyer (Republican), 15,863 (63.5%)
 Steve Andrews (DFL), 8,996 (36.0%)
 Write-in, 114 (0.5%)
 Minnesota secretary of state election, 2006
 Mark Ritchie (DFL), 1,049,432 (49.1%)
 Mary Kiffmeyer (Republican), 943,989 (44.2%)
 Bruce Kennedy (For Independent Voters), 78,522 (3.7%)
 Joel Spoonheim (Independence), 64,489 (3.0%)
 Write-in, 1,211 (0.1%)
 Minnesota secretary of state election, 2002
 Mary Kiffmeyer (Republican), 1,040,739 (47.6%)
 Buck Humphrey (DFL), 974,045 (44.5%)
 Dean Alger (Independence), 104,799 (4.8%)
 Andrew Koebrick (Green), 67,404 (3.1%)
 Write-in, 1,253 (0.1%)
 Minnesota secretary of state election, 1998
 Mary Kiffmeyer (Republican), 928,576 (46.8%)
 Edwina Garcia (DFL), 818,236 (41.2%)
 Alan Shilepsky (Reform), 192,997 (9.7%)
 Kenneth Iverson (Libertarian), 44,663 (2.2%)
 Write-in, 1,742 (0.1%)

Personal life
Kiffmeyer lives near Big Lake, Minnesota with her husband, Ralph Kiffmeyer, a nurse anesthetist who served one term in the Minnesota House of Representatives. They have four children and 14 grandchildren.

References

External links
 Second Inaugural Address (Delivered in Saint Paul, January 6, 2003)
 AU, Allies 'Let Freedom Ring' On National Day Of Prayer (Online source for 2004 National Day of Prayer quotation)
  Voting Rights Project-ACLU v. Kiffmeyer
 Minnesota Secretary of State Legislative Auditor Report for 2005 and 2006
 

 Senator Mary Kiffmeyer official Minnesota Senate website

|-

|-

|-

|-

1946 births
21st-century American politicians
21st-century American women politicians
Living people
Republican Party members of the Minnesota House of Representatives
People from Pierz, Minnesota
People from Rugby, North Dakota
People from Sherburne County, Minnesota
Secretaries of State of Minnesota
Women state legislators in Minnesota